Brian Saunders is a sound engineer. He was nominated for an Academy Award in the category Best Sound for the film Gorillas in the Mist.

Selected filmography
 Gorillas in the Mist (1988)

References

External links

Year of birth missing (living people)
Living people
BAFTA winners (people)